Napoleon I on his Imperial Throne is an 1806 portrait of Napoleon I of France in his coronation costume, painted by the French painter Jean-Auguste-Dominique Ingres.

Description

The painting shows Napoleon as emperor, in the costume he wore for his coronation, seated on a circular-backed throne with armrests adorned with ivory balls. In his right hand, he holds the scepter of Charlemagne. In his left hand, that of justice. On his head is a golden laurel wreath, similar to one worn by Julius Caesar. He also wears an ermine hood under the great collar of the Légion d'honneur, a gold-embroidered satin tunic and an ermine-lined purple velvet cloak decorated with gold bees. The coronation sword is in its scabbard and held up by a silk scarf. The subject wears white shoes embroidered in gold and resting on a cushion. The carpet under the throne displays an imperial eagle. The signature INGRES P xit is in the bottom left, and ANNO 1806 in the bottom right.

History
The painting was exhibited as work number 272 at the 1806 Paris Salon as His Majesty the Emperor on his throne, when it was recorded as being owned by the Corps législatif. At the same salon Robert Lefèvre exhibited his Portrait of Napoleon in his coronation costume. In 1815 Ingres's painting was transferred to the Louvre Museum, where it was first inventoried as MR 2069 and is now known as INV. 5420. In 1832 the comte de Forbin had it put on display in the Hotel des Invalides, at first in the chapel then from 1860 in the library. It is now on show in the Musée de l'Armée.

At the top right of the painting (and much more visibly on the preparatory drawing), cut off halfway across its width, can be seen a shield with the arms of the Papal States, Este, Lombardy, Venice and Savoy, all surmounted with the crown of Italy. From this Sébastien Allard hypothesizes that the painting was commissioned by an Italian institution to show Napoleon as king of Italy not as emperor, but, due to its innovative iconography, the original commissioners refused it and that was why it was acquired by the Corps législatif.

Models and influence

Zeus
This portrait's frontality refers to the colossal Statue of Zeus at Olympia by Phidias, whose pose served as the model not only for many representations of sovereigns but also for Christian iconography. Ingres himself also used this pose for his Jupiter and Thetis. The Musée de Montauban has a chalice with an image after a Byzantine panel showing the seated emperor, which may have been Ingres' direct model.

Jan van Eyck
For Robert Rosenblum, Ingres's model was the figure of God the Father on the Ghent Altarpiece by Jan van Eyck, which was in the Louvre at the time Ingres painted this portrait. The contemporary critic Pierre-Jean-Baptiste Chaussard compared Ingres's style in this portrait to that of Van Eyck (then known as Jean de Bruges):

However, Ingres himself stated:

Raphael
In the left border of the carpet, among medallions of the zodiac, is a medallion with a version of the Madonna della seggiola by Raphael, the artist Ingres most admired. Ingres pays tribute to Raphael by including this painting in the background of many of his works, such as Henri IV playing with his children and Raphael and La Fornarina and on the table in front of the subject in his Portrait of monsieur Rivière.

Reception
At the Salon, it produced a disturbing impression on the public, due not only to Ingres's stylistic idiosyncrasies but also to his depiction of the  Carolingian imagery worn by Napoleon at his coronation. David (who finished his own The Coronation of Napoleon the following year) delivered a severe judgement, and the critics were uniformly hostile, finding fault with the strange discordances of colour, the want of sculptural relief, the chilly precision of contour, and the self-consciously archaic quality. As shown above, Chaussard (Le Pausanias Français, 1806) condemned Ingres's style as gothic (the troubadour style was beginning at this time). As art historian Marjorie Cohn has written: "At the time, art history as a scholarly enquiry was brand new. Artists and critics outdid each other in their attempts to identify, interpret, and exploit what they were just beginning to  perceive as historical stylistic developments." The Louvre, newly filled with booty seized by Napoleon in his campaigns in Belgium, the Netherlands, and Italy, provided French artists of the early nineteenth century with an unprecedented opportunity to study, compare, and copy masterworks from antiquity and from the entire history of European painting. From the beginning of his career, Ingres freely borrowed from earlier art, adopting the historical style appropriate to his subject, leading critics to charge him with plundering the past.

Notes

Bibliography
 Porterfield, Todd, and Susan Siegfried. Staging Empire: Napoleon, Ingres, and David (Penn State Press, 2006). online review.
 Robert Rosenblum, Ingres édition Cercle d'Art nouvelle édition augmentée 1986  - p. 68, plate 7.
 Emmanuelle Amiot-Saulnier, «Napoléon Ier sur le trône impérial par Jean-Auguste-Dominique Ingres», fiche 435 B, L'Estampille l'objet d'art, n° 435, mai 2008.

Further reading

External links

 Napoleon on his throne on the website for a Louvre Ingres exhibition

1806 paintings
Paintings of Napoleon
Portraits by Jean-Auguste-Dominique Ingres
Paintings in the Louvre by French artists
Napoleon
Statue of Zeus at Olympia